Palmer Hill is a mountain located in the Catskill Mountains of New York west-southwest of Delhi. Gallop Hill is located west-southwest and Dunk Hill is located east of Palmer Hill.

References

Mountains of Delaware County, New York
Mountains of New York (state)